Chris Evert defeated the defending champion Martina Navratilova in a rematch of the previous year's final, 6–3, 6–7(4–7), 7–5 to win the women's singles tennis title at the 1985 French Open. It was her sixth French Open singles title and her 17th major singles title overall.

Seeds
The seeded players are listed below. Chris Evert is the champion; others show the round in which they were eliminated.

  Martina Navratilova (finals)
  Chris Evert (champion)
  Hana Mandlíková (quarterfinals)
  Manuela Maleeva (quarterfinals)
  Helena Suková (second round)
  Zina Garrison (second round)
  Claudia Kohde-Kilsch (semifinals)
  Carling Bassett (fourth round)
  Catarina Lindqvist (second round)
  Bonnie Gadusek (fourth round)
  Steffi Graf (fourth round)
  Barbara Potter (first round)
  Kathy Rinaldi (third round)
  Gabriela Sabatini (semifinals)
  Andrea Temesvári (first round)
  Pam Casale (second round)

Qualifying

Draw

Key
 Q = Qualifier
 WC = Wild card
 LL = Lucky loser
 r = Retired

Finals

Earlier rounds

Section 1

Section 2

Section 3

Section 4

Section 5

Section 6

Section 7

Section 8

See also
 Evert–Navratilova rivalry

References

External links
1985 French Open – Women's draws and results at the International Tennis Federation

Women's Singles
French Open by year – Women's singles
French Open - Women's Singles
1985 in women's tennis
1985 in French women's sport